Neoregelia princeps is a species of flowering plant in the family Bromeliaceae. It is native to Brazil.

Cultivars

 Neoregelia 'Bali Hai'
 Neoregelia 'Burning'
 Neoregelia 'Candy Pink'
 Neoregelia 'Cardinal Sin'
 Neoregelia 'Cool Jazz'
 Neoregelia 'Decora'
 Neoregelia 'Deep Regard'
 Neoregelia 'Dreams'
 Neoregelia 'Eddy'
 Neoregelia 'Elegance'
 Neoregelia 'Extravaganza'
 Neoregelia 'Fost Prince'
 Neoregelia 'Granada'
 Neoregelia 'Groovy Ruby'
 Neoregelia 'Insignis'
 Neoregelia 'Jamaica'
 Neoregelia 'Lavender Lovely'
 Neoregelia 'Lepida'
 Neoregelia 'Little Prince'
 Neoregelia 'Marvelous Party'
 Neoregelia 'Nina'
 Neoregelia 'Orchid'
 Neoregelia 'Poppycock'
 Neoregelia 'Prince Fost'
 Neoregelia 'Princely Pink'
 Neoregelia 'Purple Haze'
 Neoregelia 'Purple Paint'
 Neoregelia 'Red Candy Stripe'
 Neoregelia 'Royal Prince'
 Neoregelia 'Secret Heart'
 Neoregelia 'Sincerely'
 Neoregelia 'Sweet Alice'
 Neoregelia 'Syncopate'
 Neoregelia 'Twilight'
 Neoregelia 'Ultimate'
 Neoregelia 'Vanity'
 Neoregelia 'Velvet Blue'
 Neoregelia 'Verna'
 Neoregelia 'Western Prince'
 × Neophytum 'Gary Hendrix'

References

BSI Cultivar Registry Retrieved 11 October 2009

princeps
Flora of Brazil
Taxa named by John Gilbert Baker
Taxa named by Lyman Bradford Smith